Muhammad Husain Azad ( — ; 5 May 1830 – 22 January 1910) was a scholar and an Urdu writer who wrote both prose and poetry, but he is mostly remembered for his prose. His best known work is Aab-e-Hayat ("Elixir of Life").

Early life and family 
Muhammad Hussain was born in Delhi to a Persian immigrant family. His mother died when he was four years old. His father, Moulvi Muhammad Baqir was educated at the Delhi College. In early 1837, Azad's father bought a printing press and launched the Delhi Urdu Akhbaar (Delhi Urdu Newspaper). In 1854, Muhammad Hussain graduated from college and began to help his father with his newspaper and publishing work.

Azad married Aghai Begum, the daughter of another Persian immigrant family. Then his world came apart during next few years due to his father-owned newspaper's support of the rebels against the British empire and restoration of Mughal emperor Bahadur Shah Zafar in Delhi temporarily in the aftermath of Indian Rebellion of 1857. After the British retook Delhi some months later and executed his father Maulvi Muhammad Baqir, his whole joint family including old women and young children were expelled from their house by force by the British authorities. A period of turmoil followed in Delhi, Azad then decided to migrate to Lahore in 1861.

Career 
Azad started teaching at the newly-founded Government College, Lahore in 1864, and later at Oriental College, Lahore. In Lahore, he came in contact with G. W. Leitner, who was the principal and founder of Anjuman-e-Punjab. In 1866, Azad became a regularly paid lecturer on behalf of the Anjuman and a year later became its secretary. In 1887, he established the Azad Library which helped him earn the title of Shams-ul-ulama (Sun among the Learned).

Along with Altaf Hussain Hali, Azad led a movement for 'natural poetry', a movement to reform classical Urdu poetry. He declared the aim of poetry to be “as we express it, it should arouse in the listeners’ heart the same effect, the same emotion, the same fervor, as would be created by seeing the thing itself, rejecting the aesthetics of classical Urdu poetry, which, according to him, was artificial and involved in a 'game of words' that did not produce genuine emotion. Sir Syed Ahmad Khan encouraged and supported both Hali and Azad in their effort to create a simple and realistic-looking creed of Urdu literature.

Works 
 Qisas ul-hind ("Stories of India") - 1869
 Nairang-e Khiyāl ("The Wonder-World of Thought") - 1880
 Aab-e-Hayat ("Water of Life/Elixir") - 1880 (this book describes the history of Urdu poetry)
 Sair-i Iran - 1886
 Sukhandān-e fārs ("On Iranian Poets") - completed in 1887 and published in 1907
 Darbār-e akbarī ("The Court of Akbar") - 1898

Death
Muhammad Hussain Azad died in Lahore on 22 January 1910 at age 79.

References

External links 
 Table of Contents -- Digital South Asia Library at dsal.uchicago.edu Aab-eHayat link to 1907 edition printed Naval Kishore Press, Lahore.
  at dsal.uchicago.edu Aab-eHayat link to English Translation, Translated and edited by Frances W. Pritchett, in association with Shamsur Rahman Faruqi

19th-century Indian Muslims
Muslim reformers
Poets from Delhi
1830 births
1910 deaths
Urdu-language poets from India
Muslim writers
Writers from Lahore
Indian literary critics
Academic staff of the Government College University, Lahore
19th-century Indian poets
20th-century Indian poets
Indian travel writers
Indian expatriates in Iran
Urdu-language travel writers
Academic staff of the Oriental College